Walnut Hills may refer to:

 Walnut Hills, Cincinnati, a neighborhood
 Walnut Hills High School (Cincinnati, Ohio)
 Walnut Hills, former name of Vicksburg, Mississippi (listed on the NRHP in Mississippi)
 Walnut Hills Cemetery (Brookline, Massachusetts) (listed on the NRHP in Massachusetts)

See also 
 Walnut Hill (disambiguation)